MiG Pilot: The Final Escape of Lieutenant Belenko is a 1980 biography by John Barron about the life and 1976 defection of Soviet Mikoyan-Gurevich MiG-25 fighter pilot Viktor Belenko to the United States.

References

Aviation books
Books about the Cold War